Starstreak is a British short-range surface to air missile that can be used as a man-portable air-defence system (MANPADS) or in heavier systems, manufactured by Thales Air Defence (formerly Shorts Missile Systems), in Belfast, Northern Ireland. It is also known as Starstreak HVM (High Velocity Missile). After launch, the missile accelerates to more than Mach 4, making it the fastest short-range surface-to-air missile in existence. It then launches three laser beam-riding submunitions, increasing the likelihood of a successful hit on the target. Starstreak has been in service with the British Army since 1997. In 2012 Thales relaunched the system as  ForceSHIELD.

Development

Development on the missile began in the early 1980s after an evaluation of missile and gun options to increase air defence capabilities showed that a high-velocity missile system would best meet the needs and could also replace existing shoulder-launched missiles. A General Staff Requirement (GSR3979) was drawn up with the requirements of the system, specifying the requirement of three launch platforms for the missile:
 A self-propelled launcher.
 A three-round lightweight launcher.
 A man-portable launcher.

In 1984, the British Ministry of Defence awarded development contracts to British Aerospace (BAe) and Shorts Missile Systems; the BAe missile was known as Thunderbolt HVM. Shorts won the competition and were awarded £356 million. Further development and a production contract materialized in November 1986, and the missile was officially accepted into service in September 1997. The missile was intended to replace the Javelin surface-to-air missile in British service. The LML and shoulder-launched versions have been in use since 2000.

In July 2001, Thales received a contract for a successor identification friend or foe system for Starstreak.

In mid-2007, Thales UK in Northern Ireland revealed that it had developed Starstreak II, a much improved successor to the Starstreak missile.

In 2011, when it won a contract for the Lightweight Multirole Missile (LMM), Thales announced it had agreed with the Ministry of Defence to "re-role previously contracted budgets to facilitate the full-scale development, series production and introduction of the LMM." The contract affected is speculated to have been Starstreak.

Description

When used in the light or MANPADS role, the Starstreak missile is transported in a sealed launch tube. This tube is attached to an aiming unit for firing. The operator tracks the target using the aiming unit's optically stabilized sight. The process of tracking the target allows the aiming unit to compute the right trajectory to bring the missile together with the target. The operator can indicate wind direction to the unit and, in the case of a long-range target, provide superelevation. When the initial tracking is complete, the operator fires the missile by pressing a button.

The missile then fires the first-stage rocket motor; this launches the missile from the tube but burns out before leaving the tube to protect the operator.  away from the operator, when the missile is at a safe distance, the second stage fires. This rapidly accelerates the missile to a burn-out velocity exceeding Mach 4 almost twice that of the Stinger missile . As the second stage burns out, three dart sub-munitions are released.

The dart housing is made from a tungsten alloy. Around half the weight of each dart – approximately  – is its explosive charge, detonated by a delayed-action, impact-activated fuse. Each dart consists of a rotating fore-body, with two canard fins, attached to a non-rotating rear assembly with four fins. The rear assembly of each dart also houses the guidance electronics including a rearwards facing sensor.

The darts do not home in on laser energy reflected from the target; instead, the aiming unit projects two laser beams which paint a two-dimensional matrix upon the target. The lasers are modulated, and by examining these modulations the sub-munitions sensor can determine the dart's location within the matrix. The dart is then steered to keep it in the centre of the matrix. The sub-munitions steer by briefly decelerating the rotating fore-body with a clutch. The front wings then steer the missile in the appropriate direction.

Earlier laser guidance systems used a single beam that had to be kept on the target at all times, the missile homing in on laser energy reflected off the target; if it moved off the target, the reflection would end and guidance would be lost until the target was regained. This problem could be reduced by making the laser's beam wider, but at the cost of reduced accuracy and reflected energy. Starstreak's system allows for the beam area to be much larger than the target while retaining pinpoint accuracy.

On impact with the target a delayed-action fuse is triggered, allowing the projectile to penetrate the target before the explosive warhead detonates. The tungsten housing is designed to fragment and maximise damage inside the target.

In September 1999, the missile was demonstrated against an FV432 armoured personnel carrier, illustrating the missile's effectiveness as a surface-to-surface weapon. Each sub-munition dart travelling at  has comparable kinetic energy to a shell from a Bofors 40 mm gun, though it lacks the armour-penetration capabilities of a purpose-built anti-tank guided missile or a dual-purpose missile (such as the Air Defence Anti-Tank System).

Advantages
Starstreak has a number of advantages over infrared homing guided, radar homing guided, and radio command guidance MCLOS/SACLOS (e.g. Blowpipe or Javelin) missiles:
 It cannot be jammed by infrared countermeasures or radar/radio countermeasures.
 It cannot be suppressed with anti-radar missiles.

Service history

The missile was brought into service with 12 Regiment Royal Artillery and 47 Regiment Royal Artillery in 1997 as part of the High Velocity Missile (HVM) system equipped with both the Air Defence Acquisition Device (ADAD) and a ×60 thermal sight. Each regiment was equipped with 108 HVM self-propelled armoured launchers mounted on the Stormer tracked chassis capable of holding eight missiles ready to fire and a further eight reloads (the original capacity of twelve was reduced during a revision). The launchers could originally run on batteries for extended periods to minimise their signature, but significant upgrades dramatically increased the system's power requirements. A light-role variant known as HVM Lightweight Multi Launch (LML), capable of holding three ready-to-fire missiles, was also brought into service with the Air Defence Troop Royal Marines and a Royal Artillery Air Assault Battery attached to 16 Air Assault Brigade. The systems' armoured variant, the HVM Self Propelled (Stormer), saw service during the Second Gulf War but did not fire. The British Army currently uses the A5 fifth-generation missile, significantly improved from the original missile. The HVM SP and LML variants now carry a mix of both Starstreak A5 and Lightweight Multirole Missiles.

In 2012, the Ministry of Defence announced that it would be placing HVM LML light role detachments equipped with Starstreak A4 missiles on top of several blocks of flats in London prior to the 2012 London Olympics. The Ministry claimed that the area was the only suitable location for an air defence detachment of the type. Some residents were upset and uncertain of the necessity of the detachment. In 2013, the British MOD ordered 200 more Starstreak missiles.

On 16 March 2022, Defence Secretary Ben Wallace announced that the UK would supply Ukraine with Starstreak missiles to help prevent Russian air supremacy following the 2022 Russian invasion of Ukraine. British soldiers trained Ukrainian forces to use the system. HVM SPs were also deployed to Poland as an interim measure until the arrival of Sky Sabre. In April 2022, Starstreak missiles were in use by Ukrainian soldiers, and it was reported that Ukrainian forces appeared to have successfully used the system to shoot down a Russian Mi-28N attack helicopter. The missile, according to footage released by the UK MOD, hit with all three projectiles, splitting the helicopter in half.

In April there were reports that the UK would be providing Alvis Stormer vehicles armed with Starstreak.

Variants

 ATASK (Air To Air Starstreak): Fired from a helicopter. This was developed in combination with McDonnell-Douglas and Lockheed-Martin electronics between 1995 and 1998 specifically for use with the AH-64 Apache. It has yet to enter service.
 LML: Fired from a Lightweight Multiple Launcher (LML) that holds three missiles ready for firing and can be used as either a stationary launch unit or mounted on a light vehicle such as a Land Rover or HMMWV (Humvee). The LML originated in a proposal under the Army Suggestions Scheme for the Javelin system.
 Seastreak: Two versions of a naval mounting have been demonstrated—a one-man mount similar to the LML but carrying a total of six missiles, and a close in weapon system mounting holding 24 missiles.
 Self-propelled (SP) HVM: Carried on an Alvis Stormer AFV with a roof-mounted eight-round launcher with internal storage for a further 8 missiles. This is the most common variant.
 Starstreak Avenger: Built to a U.S. Army requirement in the early 1990s, this system integrated the Starstreak missile on the Boeing Avenger vehicle, replacing 1 pod of Stinger missiles with 1 pod of 4 Starstreak and modifying the fire control system accordingly.
 Starstreak Mark II: Upgrade to the Starstreak.
 THOR/Multi Mission System (MMS): A four-missile turret mounted on a Pinzgauer (6×6) cross-country chassis, launched by Thales UK in 2005.
 RapidRanger MMS weapon launcher on URO VAMTAC vehicle

 Man-portable shoulder launcher

Operators

 
 HVM SP – Approx 40 systems for a front line establishment of 36 (156 originally purchased)
 HVM LML – Approx 16 systems
 
 LML – 8 LML launcher systems. Stockholm International Peace Research Institute trade registers list the number of Portable SAMs delivered as 96 with another order for 82
 
 Royal Thai Army – Ordered in 2012
 
 Indonesian Army – First order was in November 2011, followed by a second but no deliveries were made and the contract was renegotiated in January 2014 to equip five batteries of ForceShield system with Starstreak missiles, ControlMaster200 radars and weapon coordination systems, lightweight multiple launchers on Land Rover Defenders and RapidRanger weapon launchers on URO VAMTAC vehicles, at a cost of over £100m. In 2022, PT. LEN stated that 9 battery already operational out of 10 battery ordered.
 
 Malaysian Armed Forces – Ordered an undisclosed number of LML and vehicle-based variants in July 2015. In used with the ForceSHIELD defense system. Will replace the Starburst.
 
 Armed Forces of Ukraine – Deliveries announced in March 2022 as part of UK military aid during the Russo-Ukrainian War.

See also
 Lightweight Multirole Missile – multi-role missile based on Starstreak.
 Fireflash, a missile from the 1950s that used a similar configuration of an unpowered, guided munition that receives an initial acceleration from booster rockets
 Similar missiles include: Strela-2, Strela-3, Igla, Stinger, Anza (missile), Blowpipe, Javelin, Mistral, VSHORAD (India), KP-SAM Shingung and RBS 70.

References

External links

 Improved Starstreak 
 Starstreak short-range surface-to-air missile man portable system(Army recognition)
 Starstreak High Velocity Missile – Armed Forces International 
 
 Starstreak HVM – British Army website
 Starstreak High Velocity Missile – armedforced.co.uk
 Starstreak HVM – Global Security
 THOR/Multi Mission System (video) – howstuffworks.com
 Royal Marines Air Defence Troop, High Velocity Missile live firing

Post–Cold War missiles of the United Kingdom
20th-century surface-to-air missiles
Surface-to-air missiles of the United Kingdom
Military equipment introduced in the 1990s
Short Brothers missiles